Fallen Angel is a 1981 American made-for-television drama film which explores pedophilia. It was directed by Robert Lewis, written by Lew Hunter, and stars Melinda Dillon, Richard Masur, Dana Hill, and Ronny Cox. It is a Green/Epstein Production in association with Columbia Pictures Television. The film received a Primetime Emmy Award nomination for Outstanding Drama Special, and won a Young Artist Award for star Hill in the category of Best Young Actress.

After its initial airing on CBS, it was later released on VHS by RCA/Columbia Pictures Home Video in 1983, and turned up occasionally via syndication and cable television into the mid-1990s.

Production
The screenplay for Fallen Angel was written by Lew Hunter, and went through fourteen rewrites. Jim Green, arguing that he "did not want to make this film [and] CBS asked [us] to make it," was focused on avoiding sensationalism common in too many television films.

Plot

As the film opens, a child pornography shoot is disrupted when its young star Michelle (Cheshire) refuses to perform. The man who recruited her, pedophile Howard "Howie" Nichols (Masur), attempts to reason with director Dennis (Hayward), claiming he "just needs a few days" (in order for Michelle to have an abortion, as Howard had gotten her pregnant). However, Dennis has already made up his mind to dump Michelle and gives Howard an ultimatum: find a more cooperative young "star" or he'll blow the whistle on the operation and disappear, leaving Howard to take the rap. Faced with this threat, Howard agrees to begin searching for a new girl to take Michelle's place. 12-year-old Jennifer Phillips (Hill), a recent elementary school graduate and aspiring gymnast, fits the mold perfectly. She was voted "Most Shy" in her class, her father was recently killed in a robbery of his catering truck, she feels unable to communicate with her mother Sherry (Dillon), and she cannot accept her mother's new boyfriend (who was also her father's co-worker), Frank Dawson (Cox).

By chance, Jennifer shows up at the local video arcade while Howard is there posting an ad for the girls' softball team he coaches at the town rec center. He strikes up a brief conversation and gives her a quarter. She runs into him again while leaving. After snapping a Polaroid photo of Jennifer, Howard tells her she looks like Farrah Fawcett and that she would be great in movies. Before she departs, he takes another picture and asks Jennifer if she'd be interested in joining his softball team, to which she agrees. During their next meeting, Howard asks Jennifer if she has a nickname; when she tells him no, he dubs her "Angel" before taking yet another picture, this time comparing her to Raquel Welch. As she leaves, Howard rescinds his earlier comparison, telling her "you know why you don't look like Raquel? You're sexier."

Following a 13th birthday celebration at the coffee shop where Sherry works as a waitress, Jennifer again spends the day with Howard, who gives her a teddy bear (which she names Howard, after him) and sets up an impromptu photo shoot by the lake. Things start fairly innocent, but Howard soon asks her to lift her knee-length skirt and "show a little skin" while posing. When she proves reluctant to do so, Howard attempts to explain to her about "the beauty of the human body", even showing her some pornographic magazines, but then backs off. He does, however, make Jennifer promise to "keep our real friendship a secret."

The next day, Howard takes her to the local animal shelter to give her a puppy, whom she names Fred, but asks Jennifer to just tell her mom that she found him. They then head back to the lake for another photo shoot, with Howard now suggesting Jennifer pose without her blouse and shorts, but allowing her to keep her bra and panties on. Assuring Jennifer he'd never hurt her, she finally agrees to pose, no doubt swayed by Howard's offer to give her a full set of prints, "like a real movie star." Having decided she's ready to make her "debut", Howard arranges for Jennifer to come to the house where Dennis does his filming. After a brief meeting, Dennis realizes she's exactly what he's looking for, but Howard attempts to stop him, wanting Jennifer all to himself. However, Dennis reiterates his threat to tip off the authorities and make Howard the fall guy, and Howard backs off.

Jennifer is then teamed with a boy about her age named David (Gunn), and the two start out posing for a variety of fairly innocent shots (mostly depicting the pair kissing and cuddling), but during a shoot at the lake, Howard asks them to pose nude. A seasoned veteran, David cooperates, but Jennifer refuses. Using his manipulative tactics, Howard reminds Jennifer how much he needs her, and how he's the only one who does. Finally, after he threatens to send Fred back, a tearful Jennifer reluctantly complies, with Howard reminding her to "deny everything" and "always say no" if caught. As it turns out, Jennifer is caught when Frank spots her in a kiddie porn magazine ad that some "idiot sheet metal guys" had on one of his stops, which he informs Sherry of. Remembering what Howard told her, Jennifer denies everything when confronted, but convinced she can no longer stay at home, later runs away. She attempts to ask Howard for a place to stay (as he put his three young male stars up in a nearby apartment), but he initially refuses, only to change his mind when Jennifer gets flirtatious, assuring Howard "I'll make it up to you" and reminding him how she's "getting older and better."

Upon returning home, Sherry finds her daughter's goodbye letter (in which Jennifer admits to having been the girl in the magazine ad) and begins searching adult establishments and popular hangouts in the area. Later, she goes to the rec center, where Howard feigns surprise over Jennifer's disappearance and absence at that evening's ballgame, but promises to talk to her and send her home if he finds her. In reality, Jennifer is at the boys' apartment and avoided the game at Howard's suggestion ("it's almost the first place they'll look"). Before leaving the ball field, it suddenly occurs to Sherry to check the second number Howard had given her earlier as his "answering service," and she calls the police station to get the corresponding address. Meanwhile, Howard stops by the apartment before heading home, sends the boys into the other room and attempts to seduce Jennifer. However, only moments before he can go through with his devious plans, he is stopped in the nick of time by an angry Sherry, who now fully understands exactly what Howard was doing, and flies into a rage at him before leaving with her daughter and the boys.

Subsequently, arrested for his illegal activities, Howard prepares for the impending trial with his attorney, reviewing his testimony and attempting to justify his perversions. Meanwhile, the prosecution wants Jennifer to testify against Howard, but Sherry refuses to allow it, feeling they need to move on. However, Frank is more objective, admitting that while he's worried about what will happen to Jennifer if she testifies, he's also worried about what will happen to other kids if she doesn't, telling Sherry it could be the most important decision her daughter's ever made, and encouraging Jennifer to think about it. Gradually realizing she needs to do the right thing, Jennifer's decision is solidified by a subsequent chance encounter with Howard, who has been released on bail and attempts to talk her out of testifying. The film ends with Jennifer taking the witness stand during Howard's trial, ready to tell her story.

Cast
 Melinda Dillon as Sherry Philips
 Richard Masur as Howard Nichols
 Dana Hill as Jennifer Phillips
 Ronny Cox as Frank Dawson
 David Hayward as Dennis
 Virginia Kiser as Mrs. Foster
 Shelby Leverington as Jane Rizzo
 Adam Gunn as David
 Ronald G. Joseph as Lieutenant John Cooper (as Ron Joseph)
 David Rode as Tom
 Arthur Rosenberg as Simmons 
 Sherrie Wills as Heather
 Elizabeth Cheshire as Michelle
 Tamar Cooper as Passing Customer
 Buddy Farmer as Customer
 Jamie Green as Autoraph Girl
 Holly Henderson as Karen
 Bert Hinchman as Customer
 Tom LeVasseuer as Basketball Player #1
 Carol Lippin as Julie
 Richard Lockmiller as Customer
 Dan Magiera as Counter Customer
 Ralph Meyering Jr. as Attendant
 Lawrence Moran as Basketball Player #2 (as Larry Moran)
 Angeline Peters as Debbie
 Persephanie Silverthorn as Carol
 Penelope Sudrow as Sharon

Reception
People gave Fallen Angel a positive review, writing "Though overly long and sometimes contrived, a sober script keeps TV's latest "issue" film from succumbing to pious voyeurism." The New York Times praised the film for being "careful and serious" in expressing its subject matter, writing that it "represents a contribution of substance to the debate that undoubtedly will continue for a long while."

See also
 List of American films of 1981

References

External links

1980s American films
1980s English-language films
1981 drama films
1981 films
1981 television films
American drama television films
CBS network films
Films about pedophilia